Harold Baim (1914–1996) was a British film producer, director and writer.  He was born in Leeds in 1914; he died in Reading, Berkshire in 1996.

Life and career

According to his family, Baim left the family home in Leeds after the death of his father in 1929 and by 1936 had moved to London. Baim originally wanted to be a journalist but instead gained employment working in the film industry operating the clapperboard for film producers.  He moved into film distribution and production at MGM, United Artists and First National moving onto Columbia Pictures selling their films to the Odeon, ABC and Gaumont cinema chains.  By December 1938 aged 25 he joined the board of Renown Pictures. He married Glenda Freedman (1919 - 2021) at Hendon in April 1940 and the couple celebrated with a reception at The Dorchester.  Baim worked with film producer and distributor James George Minter at Renown, becoming a senior director with Minter in March 1941. In May 1941 Baim announced his own company, The Federated Film Corporation based at 60-66 Wardour Street, London. His first film was entitled Lady Luck.  His fellow director was Leeds based J.H. Overton. (These facts and dates are taken from interviews with Harold Baim’s surviving family 2002 to 2008 and published extracts in the trade paper Kinematograph Weekly between 1938 and 1945, copies of which are available from The British Library)

Baim became a prolific producer of 35mm short films, creating over 300 titles in his lifetime. The subjects of his early films, made by his company The Federated Film Corporation, were released in the early 1940s and featured well known music hall and variety theatre acts such as Wilson, Keppel and Betty.  His later and more well known films were mainly travelogues filmed in England, Europe, the Middle East, South Africa, America and Asia as well as music compilations featuring footage of well-known pop music acts of the era.

Nearly all of the Baim titles released after 1957 are in colour using 'Eastman-color' film stock and were produced for distribution by United Artists in the UK. Many are in wide-screen formats. Baim was keen to use wide screen and the paper archive shows he rented 'Camera-scope' lenses from Adelphi Films in the mid 1950s.  A project to restore and digitise the surviving films was started in 1999 by The Baim Collection Limited. After twenty years work over eighty of the surviving one-hundred and thirty titles have been restored and are available for licence.  More than seventy films are thought lost.

A selection of more than one hundred of the films are available for review by researchers and producers on-line via Vimeo.

In 1976 Baim became Chief Barker of the Variety Club of Great Britain having been a board member and supporter for the previous ten years.

From 2012 until 2016, eight titles made up part of the programming on Sky Arts in HD: Swinging UK, UK Swings Again, Girls Girls Girls!, Big City, Telly Savalas Looks at Birmingham, Get 'Em Off, Playground Spectacular and Jugglers and Acrobats.

BBC Television Entertainment Department produced a television programme entitled Harold Baim's Britain on Film featuring 30 minutes of clips from twenty-three of the British films.  Part of the "On Film" series it was first broadcast on BBC 4 on 27 July 2011, repeated 29 May 2012.  The programme was received enthusiastically by reviewers and critics in newspaper reviews after the first transmission in The Telegraph, The Independent, The London Evening Standard and The Mirror which are available on-line.

Clips and excerpts from the Baim Collection are often used as illustrative footage in feature films and television documentaries seen on BBC One, BBC Two and BBC Four and by producers of programmes screened by ITV and Channel Four Television in the UK. The feature film THE DUKE which premiered at the 2020 Venice Film Festival makes use of Baim images from the early ‘60s.

The Baim Collection continues to search for lost prints and negatives of over one hundred missing titles produced by Harold Baim. Many of the missing films were produced between 1945 and 1957, the earlier ones most probably on nitrocellulose (cellulose nitrate) film stock which is unstable and liable to spontaneously combust.  Surviving films from this time would have been transferred to 16mm or 35 mm safety film stock.  One such film is Science Is Golden (1949), which was returned to The Baim Collection Limited in 2010 after a 16mm black-and-white print of the film was discovered in a school cupboard.  The film was returned by the Department of English and Media at Anglia Ruskin University in Cambridge.  The film features Professor Low, who shows how to make "home made" explosives for use in "magic tricks" and also shows a very early domestic microwave oven and other household labour-saving gadgets for the home, accompanied by the unique Harold Baim script.

In 2013 MGM/UA in London discovered a number of Baim films made in the late 1950s and early '60s in their vaults at Denham and have kindly returned the titles to The Baim Collection.  The titles include "Cormorant Fishing", "Cotswold Craftsmen" and "Where The Avon Flows".  These films have been digitised by deluxe142 in London and are now added to the Collection.  MGM/UA have also returned elements missing from other films, a total of 36 cans of 35mm and 16mm negative and prints.

In November 2013 The Media Archive for Central England (MACE) discovered a 16mm print of the "lost" Baim black and white film about magic and magicians, "Say Abracadabra".  The film dates from 1952 and MACE kindly returned it to the Collection.  The film was digitised at deluxe 142 Wardour Street in London who also transferred the 1946 film "Stadium Highlights" from Nitrate stock.  This Nitrate film has been stored for many years by the BFI in the National Archive and has not been seen since its original release.  The subject matter is The Empire Pool Wembley.

In June 2015 the 1965 film "The Mood Man" was also transferred from the original 35mm negative to HD files by Encore at 142 Wardour Street in London.  The film features Ross McManus singing "If I Had A Hammer" and the original negative was transferred to HD for use in a concert tour by Ross MacManus' son, Elvis Costello. Prior to this transfer a copy of the film originating from a 16mm print had been the only copy of the film available.  The 35mm negative of the Ross McManus song was released to Cinelab London who transferred the extract to 4K and undertook further minor restoration for a DVD release of Elvis Costello's 2015 tour.

Digital copies (ProRes files) of over 80 titles transferred from the original negative including these recently rediscovered titles, have been donated to the BFI's National Archive.

The travelogues are perhaps the best known and best remembered of Baim's output.  Baim wrote the scripts which were recorded by well known actors and broadcasters of the period including the voice-over talents of Valentine Dyall, David Gell, Peter Dimmock, Terry Wogan, Ed Bishop, Franklin Engelmann, Kenneth MacLeod and Nicholas Parsons.

Harold Baim applied a consistent formula to the creation of his films. No one addresses the camera; the camera becomes the narrator's 'eyes' as they interpret the scene. Wherever he went from Alsace to Aberdeen, (alliteration was a well-used device in the Baim formula) he took the same consistent approach in introducing his subjects to the audience. He often opened a travelogue by featuring transport facilities such as motorways, bus stations and airports (a particular favourite). Then he'd record the old town, educate the audience with a bit of history and then contrast this with new "sophisticated" office blocks and shopping centres. The shadow of World War Two looms large in the films. The overseas travel depicted was a world away from the holiday aspirations experienced by the everyday British cinema-goer who, at the time, was much more likely to have ventured no further afield than the British seaside.  Not everyone in the industry was a fan of Baim and he was attacked in publications, notably in a slim volume entitled "A Long Look at Short Films" published in 1966.  In November of that year Baim took part in a BBC television programme entitled "The Look of the Week" where he robustly defended his work.

Baim provided an early career boost for Michael Winner (1935–2013) who directed and scripted five Baim films from 1959 to 1963.  Winner gained his first Associate Producer credit on Floating Fortress concerning life on aircraft carrier HMS Victorious.  Winner also directed the popular comedy about modern manners Behave Yourself.  This is one of the few Baim films in which actors speak and is one of a small number of surviving titles shot in black and white.  Michael Winner makes a fleeting appearance in the title sequence of Behave Yourself.  Also amongst the Winner titles (where he can also be glimpsed as an airline passenger at the start of the film) is the feature-length musical The Cool Mikado starring Frankie Howerd and Tommy Cooper based on the comic opera by Gilbert and Sullivan.  An unrestored copy of this film was released on DVD by Strike Force Entertainment.  The title is now deleted from their catalogue but second-hand copies are available on-line.

The other surviving black and white films are Playing the Game, a comic look at the game of golf released in 1967, A Pocket Full of Rye, Where The Avon Flows, Our Mr Shakespeare, Cartoons and Cartoonists, The Things People Do, Stadium Highlights, and Science is Golden.

Several 'B' features were also made by Baim, including the haunted house thriller Night Comes Too Soon (aka The Ghost of Rashmon Hall) and The Fantastic World of Film a compilation of early silent American comedy films.

The Baim short films were originally created for the British cinema and mainly made for distribution with United Artists features enabling the chain to meet legal requirements for the minimum number of UK-made productions shown.  The legislation was first introduced in the 1927 Cinematograph Act. Sometimes these short documentary films were called Quota Quickies in the industry, due to the fact they were made to meet the Quota of UK productions required under cinema distribution legislation of the time.

A radio documentary on Baim's films, entitled Telly Savalas and the Quota Quickies, was first broadcast on BBC Radio 4 on 26 April 2008. Presenter Laurie Taylor investigated Baim's film legacy through the productions Telly Savalas Looks at Birmingham, Telly Savalas Looks at Portsmouth, and Telly Savalas Looks at Aberdeen.

The radio programme together with more detailed information and films clips are available on the Baim Films website.

Viewing copies of all titles mentioned above are held for public reference by the BFI and The Baim Collection.

References

External links 
Baim Films

1914 births
1996 deaths
English film producers
20th-century English businesspeople